Ceromya monstrosicornis is a Palearctic species of fly in the family Tachinidae.

Distribution
Germany, United Kingdom.

References

Insects described in 1924
Diptera of Europe
Tachininae